In travel, a transfer is local travel arranged as part of an itinerary, typically airport to hotel and hotel to hotel. Transfer has some features that distinguish it from ground transportation alternatives. These features are meeting directly in a transport hub, the opportunity to choose a car class and additional options like a baby seat.

Classification

There are few transfer classifications based on
 route:
 from/to the transport hub
 intercity
 to or from sightseeing locations;
 purpose:
 touristic
 business;
 number of tourists:
 individual (one person or family)
 group (more than four people);
 comfort level:
 economy
 comfort
 premium
The most popular tourist transfers are individual economy class transfers (about 52,3% of all orders).

References

Travel